Associação Atlética Rioverdense, commonly known as Rioverdense, is a Brazilian football club based in Rio Verde, Goiás state. They competed in the Série C once.

History
The club was founded on April 12, 1985. The club finished as Campeonato Goiano runners-up in 1998 and in 2005. They competed in the Série C in 1998, when they were eliminated in the First Stage of the competition.

Stadium
Associação Atlética Rioverdense play their home games at Estádio Mozart Veloso do Carmo. The stadium has a maximum capacity of 8,000 people.

References

Association football clubs established in 1985
Football clubs in Goiás
1985 establishments in Brazil